Aalburg is a former municipality in the southern Netherlands, in the province of North Brabant. The municipality had been formed in 1973 by the merging of the former municipalities of Eethen, Veen, and Wijk en Aalburg. On January 1, 2019 it joined Werkendam and Woudrichem in the new municipality of Altena.

Population centres 
 Babyloniënbroek
 Drongelen
 Eethen
 Genderen
 Meeuwen
 Veen
 Wijk en Aalburg (town hall)

Sport

Cycling 
Aalburg hosted the annual 7-Dorpenomloop Aalburg, an elite women's road bicycle race since 2007.

References

External links 

 

Geography of Altena, North Brabant
Land van Heusden en Altena
Former municipalities of North Brabant
Municipalities of the Netherlands disestablished in 2019